Caravan Radio was a pop up Digital Radio station that broadcast nationally in Australia while Hamish & Andy  tour the United Kingdom in 2010 on their fourth Caravan of Courage journey. The station is part of the Austereo Today Network.

The station was a CHR format and had the same playlist as the Today Network.

Availability
The station was broadcast on DAB+ in Sydney, Melbourne, Brisbane, Adelaide and Perth

The station also streamed online on all the Today Network websites.

See also

 TWNN

External links 
2Day FM Sydney
Fox FM Melbourne
B105 Brisbane
HIT 107 Adelaide
92.9 Perth

References

Digital radio in Australia
Digital-only radio stations
Caravan Radio
Radio stations disestablished in 2010
Defunct radio stations in Australia